Fleeshman is a surname. Notable people with the surname include:

David Fleeshman (born 1952), British actor and theatre director
Emily Fleeshman (born 1986), English actress
Richard Fleeshman (born 1989), English actor and singer-songwriter
Rosie Fleeshman (born 1992), English actress